Viitna Landscape Conservation Area is a nature park situated in Lääne-Viru County, Estonia.

The protected area was designated in 2014 to protect Viitna eskers, its biodiversity and its surrounding areas.

References

Nature reserves in Estonia
Geography of Lääne-Viru County